This article records new taxa of plants that were described during the year 2014, as well as other significant discoveries and events related to paleobotany that occurred in the year 2014.

Chlorophytes

Ferns

Ginkgophyta

Ginkgophytes

Conifers

Pinales

Other conifers

Angiosperms

Magnoliids

Monocots

Basal eudicots

Proteales

Ranunculales

Superasterids

Superrosids

Saxifragales

Fabids

Malvids

Other angiosperms

Other seed plants

Other plants

References

2014 in paleontology
Paleobotany
2014 in science